The 1946–47 Rochester Royals season was the franchise's second season in the National Basketball League (NBL). The team finished with the best record in the league.

1946–47 NBL standings

Eastern Division

Western Division

Team statistics

Regular season

Playoffs

Rewards and Honors
1st Team: Al Cervi, Bob Davies
2nd Team: Red Holzman
League MVP: Bob Davies

Transactions

References

Sacramento Kings seasons
Rochester
Rochester Royals
Rochester Royals